The Commandement de la Défense Aérienne et des Opérations Aériennes (CDAOA or Air Defence and Air Operations Command) is one of three commands of the French Air and Space Force. It is essentially the organisation that controls the air defence of France and routine air force training.

The Centre de détection et de contrôle militaire (CDC) are the regional radar centres, which pass information to the Centre de Conduite des Opérations Aériennes (CCOA), which notifies the central CDAOA.

Structure
Until 1 September 2007, it was headquartered at the Taverny Air Base in the Val-d'Oise department in northern France. At Taverny Air Base, the CCOA and CDAOA were on the same site.

 Air Defence and Air Operations Staff composed of the:
 Air Force Operational Staff and the
 Permanent readiness command center, both situated at the Balard complex (the French Air and Space Force main HQ)
 direct reporting units:
 Air Force Operations Brigade (all units at BA 942 Lyon-Mont Verdun air base)
 National Air Operations Center
 Core Joint Force Air Component HQ (Core JFAC HQ)
 Operational Center for Military Surveillance of Space Objects
 Analysis and Simulation Center for Air Operations Preparation
 Air Force Operational Awareness and Planning Brigade
 Air Force Intelligence Center at BA 942 Lyon-Mont Verdun air base
 National Target Designation Center at BA 110 Creil-Senlis air base
 Satellite Observation Military Center 01.092 "Bourgogne" at BA 110 Creil-Senlis air base
 Land-based Electronic Warfare Squadron at BA 123 Orléans-Bricy air base
 Intelligence Training Squadron 20.530 (Metz), training air and space force and naval officers, integrated in the Joint Intelligence Training Center (CFIAR) in Strasbourg
 territorial units:
 Detection and Control Center 07.927 Tours – Cinq-Mars-la-Pile (Codename: Raki, AOR: Northwestern France)
 Detection and Control Center 04.930 Mont-de-Marsan (Codename: Marina, AOR: Southwestern France)
 Detection and Control Center 05.942 Lyon – Mont Verdun (Codename: Rambert, AOR: Southeastern France)
 Detection and Control Center 05.901 Drachenbronn (Codename: Riesling, AOR: Northeastern France) – disbanded in 2015, functions absorbed into the Lyon – Mont Verdun DCC

Commanders 
Since September 2021, the head of the organisation has been Lieutenant-General Philippe Moralès.

See also
 French air defence radar systems
 List of Escadres of the French Air and Space Force

References

External links
 French government

Air traffic control in Europe
Commands of the French Air and Space Force
National air defence operations centres